Trifluperidol is a typical antipsychotic of the butyrophenone chemical class. It has general properties similar to those of haloperidol, but is considerably more potent by weight, and causes relatively more severe side effects, especially tardive dyskinesia and other extrapyramidal effects. It is used in the treatment of psychoses including mania and schizophrenia. It was discovered at Janssen Pharmaceutica in 1959.

Synthesis

The Grignard reaction between 1-benzyl-4-piperidone [3612-20-2] (1) and 3-bromobenzotrifluoride [401-78-5] (2) gives 1-benzyl-4-(3-(trifluoromethyl)phenyl)piperidin-4-ol, CID:12718203 (3). Catalytic hydrogenation removes the benzyl protecting group to give 4-[3-(trifluoromethyl)phenyl]-4-piperidinol [2249-28-7] (4). Alkylation with 4-Chloro-4'-fluorobutyrophenone [3874-54-2] (5) introduces the sidechain and hence completed the synthesis of Trifluperidol (6).

See also
 Ocaperidone

References 

4-Phenylpiperidines
Tertiary alcohols
Aromatic ketones
Belgian inventions
Butyrophenone antipsychotics
Janssen Pharmaceutica
Trifluoromethyl compounds
Typical antipsychotics